The Icelandic Civil Aviation Administration (Icelandic: Flugmálastjórn Íslands) is the aviation authority of Iceland. The authority has its headquarters in Reykjavík.

See also

DEN/ICE Agreements

References

External links
 Icelandic Civil Aviation Administration
 Icelandic Civil Aviation Administration 

Government of Iceland
Iceland
Civil aviation in Iceland
Government agencies of Iceland
Aviation organizations based in Iceland